The Reserve Division of Chaoyang was formally activated in March 1983, in Chaoyang, Liaoning. The division was then composed of:
1st Regiment
2nd Regiment
3rd Regiment
Artillery Regiment

The division was located in the city of Chaoyang, along with Beipiao, Kazuo, Jianchang, and Jianping.

As of its activation, the division was composed of 13,392 personnel, with 4 122 mm howitzers, 4 85 mm guns, 4 107mm MRLs, 4 twin-14.5 mm AA MGs, and 10 tractor vehicles.

The division was disbanded in March 1986.

References

Reserve divisions of the People's Liberation Army
Military units and formations established in 1983